This is a list of commercial banks in Somalia. 

Amal Bank
Amana Bank
Agro Africa Bank
Bushra Business Bank
 Commercial and Savings Bank of Somalia
Dara-Salaam Bank
Dahabshiil Bank International 
Daryeel Bank Limited
First Somali Bank
Galaxy International Bank
International Bank of Somalia
Idman Community Bank
My Bank Limited
Premier Bank
SomBank
Salaam Somali Bank
Somali Development Bank
 Trust African Bank 
 Banque Misr 
 Ziraat Katılım

See also

 List of banks in Africa
 List of banks in the Arab world
 Central Bank of Somalia
 Economy of Somalia

References

External links
 Website of Central Bank of Somalia

 
Banks
Somalia
Somalia